 
Rose Elliot  is a British vegetarian cookery writer. She has written 55 books on vegetarian cookery, which have sold three million copies all around the world. Her first book, Simply Delicious, was published in 1967. Her latest cookery book, The Best Of Rose Elliot: The Ultimate Vegetarian Collection was published by Mitchell Beazley in 2014.

Biography
At the age of three, she made the connection between fish to eat and the living creatures themselves and decided to become a vegetarian.

Her grandmother, Grace Cooke, was the founder of the spiritualist group White Eagle Lodge. As a member of the family, and vegetarian from the age of three, Rose began cooking vegetarian food at the White Eagle Lodge Retreat Centre "New Lands". She enthusiastically rose to the challenge and created new recipes. Her food was so popular that her recipes were much in demand. This led to her producing a small booklet for the White Eagle Lodge charity. A few publicity copies went out, including to The Times. Rave reviews led to orders from bookshops, launching her career as a cookery writer. Her books are characterized by a chatty style and anecdotes about her experiments in cookery with her family.

Inspired by her late mother, Joan Hodgson, Rose became interested in astrology at 13, dedicating her book Life Cycles to her. For 5 years she also wrote "a weekly astrological column for British magazines including Woman’s Realm, Here’s Health and She. With her husband, Robert, she developed a computer based service "Rose Elliot Horoscopes". Rose Elliot was awarded the diploma of the Faculty of Astrological Studies (DFAstrolS) and joined the Astrological Association when she was 19, and in 2005 she became a Fellow of The Association of Professional Astrologers International (APAI). Her Life Cycles was completely revised and published by Polair Publishing in November 2008.

Rose is patron of the Vegetarian Society, VIVA (Vegetarian International Voice for Animals) and The Vegetarian and Vegan Foundation. She also supports Compassion In World Farming, and OXFAM for whom she has written three best-selling books to raise funds.

She lives in Hampshire and in London, and is a member of MENSA

Awards and honours
In 1999, she was awarded the MBE for services to vegetarian cookery.

Select bibliography
Simply Delicious The White Eagle Publishing Trust 1967 
Not Just a Load of Old Lentils The White Eagle Publishing Trust 1972, 
Thrifty Fifty, 50 Low Cost Recipes, Hampshire: White Eagle Publishing Trust, 1973
 The Oxfam Vegetable Cookbook, Oxfam 1975 
 The Bean Book, Fontana 1979 
The Festive Vegetarian: Recipes and Menus for Every Occasion, New York, U.S.A.: Pantheon Books, 1983
Rose Elliot's Book of Fruits, Fontana Paperbacks, 1983
Book of Savoury Flans and Pies, Fontana. 1984.
Beanfeast; a beginner's guide to wholefood cooking, Fontana 1985 
The New Vegetarian Cookbook, London: Octopus Books, 1986
Vegetarian Mother and Baby Book, Pantheon Books, 1986
Cooking with Beans and Pulses : With foreword and star recipes by Rose Elliot, Holland & Barrett / Thorsons Publishers. 1986.
Vegetarian Dishes of the World, HarperCollins Publishers, 1988
The Zodiac Cookbook, Pyramid, 1989
Vegetarian Four Seasons, New York, NY, U.S.A.: Random House, 1994
Life Cycles, The Influence of Planetary Cycles on Our Lives, Macmillan, 1993, and Pan, 1995.
Rose Elliot's Oxfam Vegetarian Cooking For Children, Vermilion, 1995
Rose Elliot's Vegetarian Fast Food : HarperCollinsPublishers, 1996.
Gourmet Vegetarian Cooking, Thorsons, Wellingborough 1996 
Quick and Easy Vegetarian Meals for Students, Martin Books, 1997
Vegetarian Meals for Students, HarperCollins, 1997
Mother, Baby & Toddler Book, London: Harper Collins, 1997
Vegetarian Express, Phoenix, 2001
New Vegetarian Cooking: 120 Fast, Fresh, and Fabulous Recipes, Simon & Schuster, 2004
Book Of Pasta 
The Complete Vegetarian Cookbook 
Rose Elliot's Vegetarian Cookery
Rose Elliot's Vegetarian Christmas
Rose Elliot's New Complete Vegetarian Collins, 2010
Best Of Rose Elliot, Mitchell Beazley, 2014

References

Sources
 Rose Elliot, The Vegetarian Queen The goodwebGuide.co.uk. n interview with Rose Elliott. Accessed April 2008.
 Rose Elliot MBE interviewed by Jane Bowler. From The Vegetarian, Winter 2002. Accessed April 2008.
 About Rose Elliot At Rose Elliot's website. Accessed April 2008.

External links
 Personal website

Year of birth missing (living people)
Living people
British vegetarianism activists
English chefs
English food writers
Members of the Order of the British Empire
Mensans
People associated with the Vegetarian Society
Vegetarian cookbook writers
Women cookbook writers